The Unknown Woman (aliases: The Anonymous Woman) is a 1959 Egyptian film written and directed by Mahmoud Zulfikar. It is based on the play Madame X. The film features an ensemble cast that includes Shadia, Shoukry Sarhan, Kamal El-Shennawi, Emad Hamdy and Zahrat El-Ola.

It was the highest-grossing film in the Soviet Union for 1961, the only African film to ever achieve that.

Plot 
Fatima marries Dr. Ahmed and they give birth to Samir. She goes to visit her friend Souad, the police attack the place because it is suspicious and arrest everyone, including Fatima, she gets released but Ahmed divorces her. Fatima is forced to work as a singer in a Cabaret, the thug Abbas asks Fatima for a sum of money (a royalty) in order to protect her. Selling the lottery tickets, her son Samir becomes a famous lawyer, Abbas gets out of prison, and threatens Fatima in order to blackmail her family, so she kills him, then Ahmed is surprised by what she reached and regrets what he did to her, and her son Samir defends her and his father reveals her truth to him in public in court.

Staff 

 Based on: Madame X
 Adaptation: Mahmoud Zulfikar
 Screenplay: Mahmoud Zulfikar and Muhammad Othman
 Director: Mahmoud Zulfikar
 Production: Hassan Ramzy
 Distribution: Al Nasr Films Company
 Cinematography: Abdel Halim Nasr

Cast

Primary cast
 Shadia as Fatima
 Shoukry Sarhan as Samir
 Kamal El-Shennawi as Abbas
 Emad Hamdy as Ahmed
 Zahrat El-Ola as Souad
 Najma Ibrahim as Amina Hanem
 Soher El Bably as Aida
 Soraya Fakhri as Nanny

Supporting cast
 Ahmed Lokser
 Ataouta 
 Fifi Youssef
 Abdul Moneim Saudi

External links 

 The Unknown Woman on elCinema

References 

1959 films
Egyptian drama films
Films shot in Egypt
Films directed by Mahmoud Zulfikar